Diomedes Matos is a Puerto Rican musician and master instrument maker who is most famous for building string instruments. He built his first guitar at age 12 and later studied and mastered construction techniques for several traditional stringed instruments including cuatros, requintos, classical guitars, and the Puerto Rican tres. Matos'  instruments are in great demand and he has won many awards and honors for his work. In 2006, he was awarded a National Heritage Fellowship by the National Endowment for the Arts, which is the United States government's highest honor in the folk and traditional arts.

References

Year of birth missing (living people)
Living people
American musical instrument makers
Classical guitar makers
Guitarists from Florida
National Heritage Fellowship winners
People from Camuy, Puerto Rico
People from Deltona, Florida
Puerto Rican guitarists
American male guitarists